Gia2,3 may refer to:
Gia2
Gia3